Avram Davidson (April 23, 1923 – May 8, 1993) was an American writer of fantasy fiction, science fiction, and crime fiction, as well as the author of many stories that do not fit into a genre niche.  He won a Hugo Award and three World Fantasy Awards in the science fiction and fantasy genre, a World Fantasy Life Achievement award, and an Ellery Queen's Mystery Magazine short story award and an Edgar Award in the mystery genre. Davidson edited The Magazine of Fantasy and Science Fiction from 1962 to 1964.  His last novel The Boss in the Wall: A Treatise on the House Devil was completed by Grania Davis and was a Nebula Award finalist in 1998. The Encyclopedia of Science Fiction says "he is perhaps sf's most explicitly literary author".

Biography
Davidson was born in 1923 in Yonkers, New York, to Jewish parents. He served as a Navy hospital corpsman (medic) with the Marine Corps in the Pacific during World War II, and began his writing career as a Talmudic scholar around 1950. As reported at the time in the February 20, 1962 Yonkers daily, the Herald Statesman, Rabbi Arnold Weinberger officiated at his wedding to Miss Grania Kalman, which took place at the home of Damon Knight.

This made his conversion to Tenrikyo in the 1970s unexpected. Although he had a reputation for being quick to anger, Davidson was known among his friends for his generosity. His peripatetic life and career may have been due to a disinclination to finish what he began. His reputation among science fiction and fantasy readers peaked in the 1960s, after which he had a coterie of fans who (as with R. A. Lafferty) kept his reputation alive, especially after his death.

He was a member of the Swordsmen and Sorcerers' Guild of America (SAGA), a loose-knit group of Heroic Fantasy authors founded in the 1960s, some of whose works were anthologized in Lin Carter's Flashing Swords! anthologies.

While editing The Magazine of Fantasy and Science Fiction he lived in Mexico, and later in British Honduras (now renamed Belize). He lived in a rural district of Novato, in northern Marin County, California, in 1970, but later moved closer to San Francisco. He lived in a small house in Sausalito, at the southern end of Marin County next to San Francisco in 1971 and 1972, and it was there fans and friends were welcomed. He worked for a short time in the late 1970s as a creative writing instructor at the University of Texas at El Paso. In his later years, he lived in Washington state, including a brief stay in the Veterans' Home in Bremerton. He died in his tiny apartment in Bremerton on May 8, 1993, aged 70. A memorial service was held in Gasworks Park in Seattle.

He was survived by his son Ethan and his ex-wife Grania Davis, who continued to edit and release his unpublished works until her own death.

Fiction and articles
Davidson wrote many stories for fiction magazines beginning in the 1950s, after publishing his first fiction in Commentary and other Jewish intellectual magazines.

Davidson was active in science fiction fandom from his teens. His best-known works are his novels about Vergil Magus, the magician that medieval legend made out of the Roman poet Virgil; the Peregrine novels, a comic view of Europe shortly after the fall of Rome; the Jack Limekiller stories, about a Canadian living in an imaginary Central American country modelled after Belize during the 1960s; and the stories of Dr. Eszterhazy, a sort of even more erudite Sherlock Holmesian figure living in the mythical Scythia-Pannonia-Transbalkania, the waning fourth-largest empire in Europe.

Lesser known and uncollected during his lifetime are his mystery stories, which were assembled after his death as The Investigations of Avram Davidson. These mystery stories frequently have a historical setting, and are intricately plotted. In addition, Davidson ghosted two Ellery Queen mysteries, And on the Eighth Day and The Fourth Side of the Triangle, and a true crime collection, Crimes and Chaos.

Other noteworthy works are his collaborations. In Joyleg, A Folly, written in collaboration with Ward Moore, a veteran of the American Revolutionary War (and of the Whiskey Rebellion) is found alive and very well in the Tennessee backwoods, having survived over the centuries by daily soaks in whisky of his own making to hilariously face the world of the 1960s. In Marco Polo and the Sleeping Beauty, co-written with Grania Davis, the background of Marco Polo's travels in the Mongol Empire is borrowed for an original story. After Davidson's death, Grania Davis also finished The Boss in the Wall, a claustrophobic horror novel that bears little resemblance to the work of any other writer.

Davidson also wrote dozens of short stories that defy classification, and the Adventures in Unhistory essays, which delve into puzzles such as the identity of Prester John and suggest solutions to them. His earlier historical essays were scrupulously researched, even when published by magazines just as happy to offer fiction as fact. Later essays were handicapped by a lack of resources in the libraries of the small towns where Davidson lived in the pre-Internet era, but are enlivened by the style and bold speculation.

Davidson's work is marked by a strong interest in history, with his plots often turning on what at first might seem like minor events. His characterization is also unusually in-depth for fantasy, and is often enriched by his ear for unusual accents.

Davidson's most obvious characteristics are his plotting and style. Very little may happen in a Davidson story, but he described it in detail. Hidden among the detail are facts or omissions that later become important to the outcome of the story. Especially in his later works, Davidson included elements that beginning writers are told to avoid, such as page-long sentences with half a dozen colons and semi-colons, or an apparently irrelevant digression in the opening pages of a story. He expects much from his readers, but delivers much to them.

Books
Kar-Chee series
 Rogue Dragon, Ace, 1965
 The Kar-Chee Reign, Ace Double, 1966
Vergil Magus series (a fantasy series set an alternate ancient Mediterranean world in which harpies, basilisks, and satyrs exist during the Punic Wars)
 The Phoenix and the Mirror, Doubleday, 1969; issued in 1970 as The Phoenix and the Mirror or, The Enigmatic Speculum in the Ace Science Fiction Specials series
Vergil in Averno,  Doubleday, 1987
 The Scarlet Fig; or Slowly through a Land of Stone; Rose Press, 2005
 Peregrine series
 Peregrine: Primus, Walker, 1971
 Peregrine: Secundus, Berkley, 1981
 Solo novels not part of a series 
 Mutiny in Space, Pyramid, 1964
 Rork!, Berkley, 1965
 Masters of the Maze, Pyramid, 1965
 Clash of Star-Kings, Ace Double, 1966
 The Enemy of My Enemy, Berkley, 1966
 The Island Under the Earth, original to the Ace Science Fiction Specials series, 1969
 Ursus of Ultima Thule, Avon, 1973
 With Ward Moore
 Joyleg, Pyramid, 1962
 With Grania Davis
 Marco Polo and the Sleeping Beauty, Baen, 1987
 The Boss in the Wall, A Treatise on the House Devil, Tachyon Publications, 1998
 Collections
 Or All the Seas with Oysters, Berkley, 1962
 Crimes and Chaos (collection), Regency, 1962
 What Strange Stars and Skies, Ace, 1965
 Strange Seas and Shores, Doubleday, 1971
 The Enquiries of Doctor Eszterhazy, Warner, 1975
 The Redward Edward Papers, Doubleday, 1978
 The Best of Avram Davidson, Doubleday, 1979
 Collected Fantasies, Berkley, 1982
 The Adventures of Doctor Eszterhazy, Owlswick, 1990
 Adventures in Unhistory, Owlswick, 1993
 The Avram Davidson Treasury, Tor, 1998
 The Investigations of Avram Davidson, Owlswick, 1999 [collected mystery stories]
 Everybody Has Somebody in Heaven, Devora, 2000
 The Other Nineteenth Century, Tor, 2001
 ¡Limekiller!, Old Earth Books, 2003
 Ellery Queen books: mysteries written under the Ellery Queen name
 And on the Eighth Day, Random House, 1964
 The Fourth Side of the Triangle, Random House, 1965

References

Further reading
 
 
 Avram Davidson Treasury: A Tribute Collection, with an introduction by Guy Davenport. (1998)

External links

Website
Fan Club
Bactra Review – a brief appreciation of Davidson

Biography from Embiid Publishing

1923 births
1993 deaths
20th-century American novelists
American fantasy writers
United States Navy personnel of World War II
American mystery writers
American science fiction writers
American speculative fiction editors
Edgar Award winners
Hugo Award-winning writers
Jewish American novelists
People from Bremerton, Washington
People from Yonkers, New York
Place of birth missing
Science fiction editors
Tenrikyo
World Fantasy Award-winning writers
Novelists from New York (state)
Novelists from Washington (state)
American male novelists
American male short story writers
20th-century American short story writers
People from Novato, California
20th-century American male writers
Novelists from California
United States Navy corpsmen